Louisiana–Monroe Warhawks basketball may refer to either of the basketball teams that represent the University of Louisiana at Monroe:
Louisiana–Monroe Warhawks men's basketball
Louisiana–Monroe Warhawks women's basketball